Stavsjö is a locality situated in Nyköping Municipality, Södermanland County, Sweden with 212 inhabitants in 2010.

Elections 
Stavsjö and Ålberga are the two main settlements of the Kila electoral ward.

Riksdag

References 

Populated places in Södermanland County
Populated places in Nyköping Municipality